Raphael Mechoulam (5 November 1930 – 9 March 2023) was a Bulgarian-born Israeli organic chemist and professor of Medicinal Chemistry at the Hebrew University of Jerusalem in Israel. Mechoulam is best known for his work (together with Y. Gaoni) in the isolation, structure elucidation and total synthesis of Δ9-tetrahydrocannabinol, the main active principle of cannabis and for the isolation and the identification of the endogenous cannabinoids anandamide from the brain and 2-arachidonoyl glycerol (2-AG) from peripheral organs together with his students, post-doctoral students, and collaborators.

Biography
Mechoulam was born in Sofia, Bulgaria in 1930, to a Sephardic Jewish family. His father was a physician and head of a local hospital, while his mother "who had studied in Berlin, enjoyed the life of a well-to-do Jewish family". He attended an "American grade school" until his parents were forced to leave their hometown because of anti-semitic laws and his father was subsequently sent to a concentration camp,  which he survived. After the communist takeover of hitherto pro-German Bulgaria in 1944 he studied chemical engineering, which he "disliked." In 1949 his family immigrated to Israel where he later studied chemistry. He gained his first research experience in the Israeli Army working on insecticides.

Mechoulam received his M.Sc. in biochemistry from the Hebrew University of Jerusalem (1952), and his Ph.D. at the Weizmann Institute, Reḥovot (1958), with a thesis on the chemistry of steroids. After postdoctoral studies at the Rockefeller Institute, New York (1959–60), he was on the scientific staff of the Weizmann Institute (1960–65), before moving to the Hebrew University of Jerusalem, where he became professor (1972) and Lionel Jacobson Professor of Medicinal Chemistry from 1975. He was rector (1979–82) and pro-rector (1983–85). In 1994 he was elected a member of the Israel Academy of Sciences. Mechoulam was one of the founding members of the International Association for Cannabinoid Medicines and the International Cannabinoid Research Society.

Mechoulam died on 9 March 2023, at the age of 92.

Honours and awards
 1994 – Member of the Israel Academy of Sciences and Humanities
 1999-2000 – President, International Cannabinoid Research Society (ICRS)
 2000 – Israel Prize in Exact Sciences - Chemistry
 2001 – Honorary doctorate from Ohio State University
 2002 – Honorary Member of the Israeli Society of Physiology and Pharmacology
 2003-2005 – Chairman of the Board, International Association for Cannabinoid Medicines (IACM)
 2006 – Honorary doctorate from Complutense University
 2011 – NIDA Discovery Award
 2012 – EMET Prize in Exact Sciences - Chemistry 
 2012 – Recipient of the Rothschild Prize in Chemical Sciences and Physical Sciences
 2014 – IACM Award
 2016 – Genius 100 Visionary
 2018 – Honoris causa from the University of Guelph
 2019 – Honoris causa from the Weizmann Institute of Science
 2019-2020 – Harvey Prize of the Technion

Research
Raphael Mechoulam's major scientific interest was the chemistry and pharmacology of cannabinoids. He and his research group succeeded in the total synthesis of the major plant cannabinoids Δ9-tetrahydrocannabinol, cannabidiol, cannabigerol and various others. Another research project initiated by him led to the isolation of the first described endocannabinoid anandamide which was isolated and characterized by two of his postdoctoral researchers, Lumír Ondřej Hanuš and William Devane. Another endogenous cannabinoid, 2-AG, was soon discovered by Shimon Ben-Shabat, one of his PhD students. He published more than 450 scientific articles.

References

Further reading

External links
 "The Scientist" a documentary about the life and work of Raphael Mechoulam
 
 

1930 births
2023 deaths
Israel Prize in chemistry recipients
Israeli chemists
Bulgarian Jews in Israel
Israeli people of Bulgarian-Jewish descent
Academic staff of the Hebrew University of Jerusalem
Members of the Israel Academy of Sciences and Humanities
Bulgarian emigrants to Israel
Scientists from Sofia
HU cannabinoids
Cannabis researchers
Members of the Israel Society for Physiology and Pharmacology
Cannabis in Israel